Pat Thane is a professor of Contemporary History at King's College London as well as a general historian. She teaches on the MA in Politics and Contemporary History: modules on Welfare and the State in Britain 1900–1945, 1945–present and contributes to modules on politics and society since c. 1900. She was the Leverhulme Professor of Contemporary British History in 1998–2001 at the Institute of Historical Research and a professor at the University of Sussex from 1994 until 2001.

Thane is the UK Government's Chief Scientific Adviser to the Department for Work and Pensions on research capabilities and is a member of the international reference group on the Nordic welfare state for the Nordic Centre of Excellence (NordWel).

Selected publications

References

Academics of King's College London
British women academics
Living people
Year of birth missing (living people)
British historians
British women historians